Eucyclotoma cymatodes is a species of sea snail, a marine gastropod mollusk in the family Raphitomidae.

Description
The length of the shell attains 7 mm.

Distribution
This marine species occurs off New Caledonia and the Philippines.

References

External links
 Hervier R.P. (1897), Descriptions d'espèces nouvelles provenant de l'Archipel de la Nouvelle Calédonie (suite); Journal de conchyliologie t.45 s.3 (1897)
 Gastropods.com: Eucyclotoma cymatodes
 MNHN, Paris: specimen
 
 Li B.-Q. [Baoquan] & Li X.-Z. [Xinzheng] (2014) Report on the Raphitomidae Bellardi, 1875 (Mollusca: Gastropoda: Conoidea) from the China Seas. Journal of Natural History 48(17-18): 999-1025
 MNHN, Paris: specimen

cymatodes
Gastropods described in 1897